John Stetson may refer to:

John B. Stetson (1830–1906), hat manufacturer
John C. Stetson (1920–2007), U.S. Secretary of the Air Force